Super-LumiNova is a brand name under which strontium aluminate–based non-radioactive and nontoxic photoluminescent or afterglow pigments for illuminating markings on watch dials, hands and bezels, etc. in the dark are marketed. This technology offers up to ten times higher brightness than previous zinc sulfide–based materials.

Super-LumiNova is based on LumiNova pigments, invented in 1993 by Nemoto & Co., Ltd. of Japan as a safe replacement for radium-based luminous paints.  Nemoto & Co. was founded in December 1941 as a luminous paint processing company and has supplied paint to the watch and clock industry for over 70 years.

Besides being used in timepieces, Super-LumiNova is also marketed for application on:

 Instruments: scales, dials, markings, indicators etc.
 Scales: engravings, silkscreen-printing
 Aviation instruments and markings
 Jewelry
 Safety- and emergency-panels, signs, markings
 Aiming posts
 Various other parts

These types of phosphorescent pigments, often called lume, operate like a light battery. After sufficient activation by sunlight or artificial light, they glow in the dark for hours. Larger markings are visible for the whole night. This activation and subsequent light emission process can be repeated again and again, and the material does not suffer any practical aging. Strontium aluminate–based pigments have to be protected against contact with water or moisture, since this degrades the light emitting quality.

Alternative for afterglow pigments
Tritium-based devices called "gaseous tritium light source" (GTLS), that are an alternative for afterglow pigments, have the advantage of being self-powered and producing a consistent luminosity that does not fade during the night. However, they are radioactive and have a half-life of slightly over 12 years.  This means the intensity of the tritium-powered light source will gradually fade, generally becoming too dim to be useful after 20 to 30 years.

Tritium was used on almost all Swiss Watches like Rolex watches from 1960 to 1998 when it was banned. and the original Panerai Luminor dive watch Radiomir.  Tritium-based substances ceased to be used by Omega SA in 1997. By the late 1960s, radium was phased out and replaced with much safer alternatives.

See also
 Lumibrite
 Radium dial

References

External links
 Technical Features Superluminova - Archived from the original
 Luminosity in watches
 Production of strontium aluminate

Luminescence
Horology